In Singapore, law enforcement is principally led by the Singapore Police Force (SPF), and supported by other agencies including the Singapore Prison Service, Central Narcotics Bureau, Corrupt Practices Investigation Bureau, Internal Security Department, Immigration and Checkpoints Authority, and Singapore Customs. Furthermore, some law enforcement powers may be exercised by non-government entities such as auxiliary police forces and security officers.

Singapore's law enforcement system has resulted in crime being extremely low as compared to other developed nations and the world in general. According to the Economist Intelligence Unit (EIU) Safe Cities Index, Singapore was often ranked as the safest or one of the safest in the world, especially in regards to digital, personal and infrastructure security. The country also ranks highly on the Global Peace Index, being consistently placed in the top 10 and the highest in Asia for the past decade.

Foreign travel advisories for Singapore often state that petty crime such as pickpocketing and street theft as extremely rare in Singapore. Violent crime is also deemed extremely rare and almost non-existent. Threats of terrorism remain a major concern, as is the case with most developed countries. As a constant reminder from consulars to possible drug traffickers, penalties for drug offences such as trafficking in Singapore remain severe and may include capital punishment.

The Overseas Security Advisory Council (OSAC) of the United States Department of State states Singapore as being a very low-threat location for crime directed at or affecting "official U.S. government interests". The foreign advisory of the Ministry of Foreign Affairs of China also considers Singapore as a low-risk country.

Governmental law enforcement and regulatory agencies

Singapore Police Force

The Singapore Police Force is the main government agency tasked with maintaining law and order in the city-state. It was founded in 1820, and is under the supervision of the Ministry of Home Affairs.

Singapore Prison Service 

The Singapore Prison Service (SPS) was formed in 1946 and operates the prison system in Singapore, under the supervision of the Ministry of Home Affairs.

Under the Prisons Act 1933, a prisons officer has the powers of the police officer (Section 32), and may be armed (Section 31).

Corrupt Practices Investigation Bureau

The Corrupt Practices Investigation Bureau (CPIB) is a government agency in Singapore which investigates and prosecutes corruption in the public and private sectors. It was founded in 1952. Although the primary function is to investigate corruption, it is empowered to investigate other criminal cases in which corruption may be involved. Under the purview of the Prime Minister's Office, the CPIB is headed by a director who reports directly to the Prime Minister.

A CPIB officer has the powers of arrest under Section 15 of the Prevention of Corruption Act 1960, and may also investigate any other offence under written law which may be uncovered during investigations under Section 17 of the same act. A CPIB officer may also be armed under Section 87 of the Guns, Explosives and Weapons Control Act 2021 and Section 15A of the Prevention of Corruption Act 1960.

Internal Security Department

The Internal Security Department (ISD) is a domestic intelligence agency of the Ministry of Home Affairs founded in 1966. It has the utmost right to detain without trial individuals suspected to be a threat to national security. The stated mission is to confront and address security threats, including foreign subversion and espionage. The ISD also monitors and addresses the prevention of racial tension which might affect the public peace, surveillance, apprehension of militants and protection of Singapore's national borders.

Under Section 65 of the Police Force Act 2004, an intelligence officer has the powers of a police officer. Under Section 87 of the Guns, Explosives and Weapons Control Act 2021, an intelligence officer may be armed.

Security and Intelligence Division 

The Security and Intelligence Division (SID) is a foreign intelligence agency under the Ministry of Defence founded in 1966 alongside the ISD.

Under Section 65 of the Police Force Act 2004, an intelligence officer has the powers of a police officer. Under Section 87 of the Guns, Explosives and Weapons Control Act 2021, an intelligence officer may be armed.

Singapore Armed Forces Military Police Command 

The Singapore Armed Forces Military Police Command (SAFMPC) is the military police formation of the Singapore Armed Forces (SAF), founded in 1966.

Central Narcotics Bureau 

The Central Narcotics Bureau (CNB) is in charge of enforcement of drug law and drug education. It was founded in 1971.

A CNB officer has the powers of a police officer and may be armed under Section 32 and 32A respectively of the Misuse of Drugs Act 1973.

Singapore Civil Defence Force Provost Unit 

The Singapore Civil Defence Force Provost Unit (PU) is responsible for enforcement and investigation of all service offences as found in the Civil Defence Act as well as the administration of the SCDF Detention Barracks.

Inland Revenue Authority of Singapore 

The Inland Revenue Authority of Singapore (IRAS) is a statutory board founded in 1992 and under the Ministry of Finance for the collection of taxation revenue.

Under section 65F of the Income Tax Act, and section 83E of the Good and Services Tax Act, an officer of IRAS may make an arrest for offences under the same acts. Furthermore, under section 65H of the Income Tax Act, and section 83G of the Good and Services Tax Act, an officer of IRAS may also be armed.

Land Transport Authority 

The Land Transport Authority (LTA) is a statutory board founded in 1995 and under the Ministry of Transport to execute transport policy. Under section 39 of the Land Transport Authority of Singapore Act, an officer of the LTA may exercise powers of a police officer in enforcing sections of the Road Traffic Act and also make an arrest for such offences.

Ministry of Manpower 

The Ministry of Manpower (MOM) is a ministry established in 1998 to oversee labour policies.

Under section 18 of the Employment Agencies Act and section 21 of the Employment of Foreign Manpower Act, inspectors of employment agenices and employment are permitted to make an arrest for offences against the same acts.

Immigration and Checkpoints Authority 

The Immigration and Checkpoints Authority (ICA) is in charge of immigration, Singapore passports, identity cards, Citizen Registration (Birth and Death), permanent residents services, customs, issuing permits to foreigners such as visit passes, visas and student passes. The ICA is also in charge of enforcing immigration and visa laws. It ensures that the movement of people, goods and conveyances through the checkpoints is in accordance with regulations imposed by the Ministry of Home Affairs. It is in charge of birth and death registrations.  The organisation was formed on 1 April 2003 with the merger of Singapore Immigration and Registration and the border control functions of Customs and Excise Department.

Under the Immigration Act 1959, an ICA officer has powers of a police officer to enforce the provisions of the act (under Section 38) and may be armed (under Section 38A).

Singapore Customs

The Singapore Customs was formed in 2003 and is in charge of the collection of customs revenue, prevention of evasion of duties and taxes, issuing customs licenses and permits, enforcement of trade requirements under the respective Free Trade Agreements (FTAs), and regulation of trade in strategic goods and strategic goods technology. It is under the Ministry of Finance.

Under Section 112 of the Customs Act 1960, a customs officer has powers of arrest for offences under the same act. Under Section 87 of the Guns, Explosives and Weapons Control Act 2021, a customs officer may be armed.

Non-governmental agencies

Auxiliary police forces 
Auxiliary police forces are private companies with officers who are granted police-like powers and law enforcement authority. They are typically employed for infrastructure security and cash-in-transit protection. They are supervised and licensed by the Singapore Police Force. Five auxiliary police forces are designated by legislation:

 Aetos Auxiliary Police Force (part of Aetos Security Management)
 Certis CISCO Auxiliary Police Force (part of Certis Group)
 Installations Auxiliary Police Force
 Pulau Bukom Auxiliary Police Force
 SATS Auxiliary Police Force (part of SATS Security Services)

Security officers 
Under section 22 of the Infrastructure Protection Act, security officers have a limited power of arrest.

Comparison of law enforcement agencies

See also

Fast Response Car
Law of Singapore
Misuse of Drugs Act (Singapore)
Neighbourhood police centre

References